Roberto Calmon Félix (born 29 July 1978), known simply as Roberto, is a Brazilian former footballer who played as a striker.

He spent the vast majority of his professional career in Portugal, mainly with Vitória de Guimarães where he arrived at the age of 30. He amassed Primeira Liga totals of 95 games and 15 goals over the course of six seasons, adding 133 matches and 38 goals in the Segunda Liga.

Playing career
Roberto was born in Linhares, Espírito Santo. He played almost exclusively in Portugal during his career, spending most of his early years in the second division, representing F.C. Maia, Moreirense F.C. and Académica de Coimbra, where he first arrived in the Primeira Liga.

After another slow year, with C.F. Estrela da Amadora, Roberto returned to the second level with G.D. Chaves, F.C. Marco and Varzim SC. In January 2008, after solid performances for the latter, he signed a -year contract with top-flight club Vitória SC, being a relatively important attacking unit – 14 matches, two goals – as they finished third only one year after promoting.

After two more seasons in the top tier with Vitória being used regularly (and averaging six league goals in the process), the 32-year-old Roberto joined Asteras Tripolis F.C. in Greece, signing for one year. In March 2011, however, he moved teams and countries again, transferring to Chinese Super League side Beijing Guoan FC.

Coaching career
After retiring in 2014 at his first club Linhares Futebol Clube, Roberto started his managerial career precisely there. After leading them to the Campeonato Capixaba vice-championship, he returned on 6 January 2016.

References

External links

1978 births
Living people
Sportspeople from Espírito Santo
Brazilian footballers
Association football forwards
Campeonato Brasileiro Série A players
Linhares Futebol Clube players
Associação Portuguesa de Desportos players
Clube Atlético Bragantino players
Primeira Liga players
Liga Portugal 2 players
Segunda Divisão players
F.C. Maia players
Moreirense F.C. players
Associação Académica de Coimbra – O.A.F. players
C.F. Estrela da Amadora players
G.D. Chaves players
F.C. Marco players
Varzim S.C. players
Vitória S.C. players
Gil Vicente F.C. players
Super League Greece players
Asteras Tripolis F.C. players
Chinese Super League players
Beijing Guoan F.C. players
Brazilian expatriate footballers
Expatriate footballers in Portugal
Expatriate footballers in Greece
Expatriate footballers in China
Brazilian expatriate sportspeople in Portugal
Brazilian expatriate sportspeople in Greece
Brazilian expatriate sportspeople in China
Brazilian football managers
Linhares Futebol Clube managers